"And So It Goes" is a song written by Billy Joel in 1983, though it was not released until six years later. It appeared as the tenth and final track of his 1989 studio album Storm Front. The original 1983 demo was released on the 2005 box set My Lives. Joel wrote the song about a doomed relationship with model Elle Macpherson. Their relationship was dramatic, as Macpherson was only a teenager while Joel was reaching his mid-30s. Joel dated Macpherson for a brief time shortly before becoming involved with model Christie Brinkley, who would ultimately become his second wife. 

The song was inspired by the Scottish ballad "Barbara Allen", and is unique for Joel as it is written in iambic tetrameter. In the original demo version of "And So It Goes," Joel sings the melody simply, accompanied by a simple piano backdrop, in a style very reminiscent of a hymn. On the 1989 album version, Joel sings and plays all the instrumentation (piano and synthesizers). The official video is from a live performance in front of a concert audience.

Release
The single peaked at No. 37 on the U.S. Billboard Hot 100 and No. 5 on the U.S. Adult Contemporary chart in 1990. It has been covered by many subsequent artists. The King’s Singers and others have developed several vocal harmony arrangements of the song, which are often performed by high school and college choirs.

Charts

References

1990 singles
Billy Joel songs
Songs written by Billy Joel
Columbia Records singles
1983 songs